The Shire of Huntly was a local government area immediately to the northeast of the regional city of Bendigo, Victoria, Australia.

The town of Huntly is around ten kilometres north of the centre of Bendigo.

History
The need for a council at Huntly arose from gold and quartz mining in the area, including alluvial deposits and some deep leads. Huntly was first incorporated as a road district on 10 March 1861, and became a shire on 13 July 1866. From 1867 until 1977, councillors met at the Council Chambers at 620-634 Midland Highway, Huntly, but subsequently they moved into a new location.

On 7 April 1994, the Shire of Huntly was abolished and, along with the City of Bendigo, the Borough of Eaglehawk, the Rural City of Marong and the Shire of Strathfieldsaye, was merged into the newly created City of Greater Bendigo.

Wards
The Shire of Huntly was divided into three wards, each of which elected three councillors:
 North Ward
 South Ward
 West Ward

Towns and localities

* Council seat.

Population

* Estimate in the 1958 Victorian Year Book.

References

External links
 Victorian Places - Huntly Shire

Huntly
1861 establishments in Australia
Bendigo